Muzaffer Ergüder (1886 – 19 February 1962) was a Turkish career officer, politician, and an official of the CHP. In 1946, he quit from the CHP and joined the Democrat Party.

References 

1886 births
1962 deaths
20th-century Turkish politicians
Democrat Party (Turkey, 1946–1961) politicians
People from Bursa
Place of death missing
Republican People's Party (Turkey) politicians